Angamaly for Kalady (station code: AFK) is a railway station Located at Angamaly (major suburb of Kochi City) in Ernakulam district of Kerala state in India operated by Southern Railway Network. It lies in the Shoranur–Cochin Harbour section of Trivandrum division. Angamaly is the halting point for 46  trains including Express and all Passenger trains passing through this station. The railway station is located about 26 km from Ernakulam Town and 10 km from  stations. It Is the nearest railway station of Cochin International Airport.

Angamaly ranked 28 out of 104 for earnings during 2016–17 fiscal year.

The proposed rail line to Sabarimala is starting from here. The proposed line starts from Angamaly in Ernakulam district and ends at Erumelli, one of the major Ayyappa pilgrims base camp centre, at Kottayam district. The centre has allocated a total outlay of Rs 923 crore to the state for various railway projects for the year 2018–19. The new projects announced are the Rs 1518-crore doubling in the Thiruvananthapuram–Kanyakumari section and a third line in the 107-km-long Ernakulam–Shornur congested sector. The estimated cost of the project when it was conceived years ago was Rs 517 crore. But due to delay in implementation, the cost had escalated to Rs 1,566 crore now.

Layout 
Angamaly railway station has 3 platforms to handle long-distance and Passenger trains and 2 platforms to handle cargo. There is one entrance at present.

Revenue 
Angamaly railway station is a low-revenue station for Thiruvananthapuram rail division. In the financial year 2016–17 it earned only 7cr rupees, with 21 lakh passengers using the service.

Nearby places 
 Cochin International Airport – (4.42 km)
 Sri Adi Sankara Keerthi Sthamba Mandapam – (7.4 km)
 Sri Ramakrishna Advaita Ashram (8.3 km)
 Dreamworld Water Park (34 km)
 Silver Storm Water Theme Park (36 km)
 Wonderla Kochi (30 km)
 Thattekad Bird Sanctuary (45 km)
 Cherai Beach (27.4 km)
 Malayattoor Church (16 km)
 The Village, Mangattukara, Angamaly (3 km)

Trains passing through Angamaly railway station

Demands 
 Establish Sabari Rail Project soon
 Modernization of existing rail terminal
 Modification of platform 3
 Extension of 56605/Coimbatore–Trissur Passenger train to Angamaly
 Extension of 56663/Thrissur–Kozhikode Passenger train to Angamaly
 Extension of Cochin Harbour Terminus DEMU to Angamaly
 Subway at platforms
 LED displays at the terminal
 Transfer of goods yard to Karukutty
 Opening of passenger amenities centre
 Stoppage for 16791/Punalur–Palakkad Palaruvi Express
 Stoppage for 12617/Mangala Lakshadweep SF Express
 Stoppage for 12678/Ernakulam–Bangalore Intercity
 Stoppage for 12696/Trivandrum Express
 Restart Angamaly–Ernakulam MEMU
 Construction of overbridge thereby making the platform one

See also 
 Sabarimala Railway

References 

 Google Map: https://www.google.com/maps/@13.0523136,80.2095104,12z
 Indian Rail Info: https://indiarailinfo.com/arrivals/angamaly-for-kalady-afk/49
 2016–17 incomes: Annual passenger earnings details of railway stations in Kerala#Notes

Thiruvananthapuram railway division
Railway stations in Ernakulam district
Angamaly